Leonardo Javier Pais Corbo (born 7 July 1994) is a Uruguayan footballer who plays as a midfielder for Montevideo Wanderers.

Club career
Pais began his professional playing career with Defensor Sporting, and made his professional debut on 1 December 2012, against Cerro Largo. Pais finished the season with 10 appearances.

Cruzeiro 

On April 19, 2022, he agreed to go to Cruzeiro, team from Brazil.

International career
Pais played for both under-17 and under-20 levels, also appearing in 2011 Pan American Games.

References

External links

1994 births
Living people
Uruguayan footballers
Uruguayan expatriate footballers
Uruguay youth international footballers
Association football midfielders
Footballers at the 2011 Pan American Games
Uruguay under-20 international footballers
Pan American Games medalists in football
Pan American Games bronze medalists for Uruguay
Medalists at the 2011 Pan American Games
Uruguayan Primera División players
Ascenso MX players
Campeonato Brasileiro Série B players
Defensor Sporting players
Montevideo City Torque players
FC Juárez footballers
Liverpool F.C. (Montevideo) players
Montevideo Wanderers F.C. players
Cruzeiro Esporte Clube players
Uruguayan expatriate sportspeople in Brazil
Expatriate footballers in Brazil